Anthony Rizzo (born 1989) is a Major League Baseball player.

Anthony Rizzo or Tony Rizzo may also refer to:

Tony Rizzo, Ontario politician
Tony Rizzo on the Radio